Crown Airways was a regional airline operating for USAir Express with its headquarters on the grounds of DuBois Regional Airport in Washington Township, Jefferson County, Pennsylvania, near Falls Creek. Allegheny Commuter was the brand name for the regional affiliate of Allegheny Airlines, under which a number of individually owned commuter air carriers operate short and medium haul routes. The airline is often credited as the first code-share agreement between a major airline and smaller commuters.

History 
Crown Airways started as feeder airline for Allegheny Commuter in March 1969. Allegheny Commuter was started in March 1967, when Henson Airlines began operating as a feeder carrier for Allegheny Airlines, predecessor to US Airways. The initial route was from Baltimore to Hagerstown. This is generally credited as the airline industry's first code-share agreement and the first major airline to use another airline as its commuter partner, At the time the idea was considered nothing short revolutionary in the industry. Within the code-share agreement the smaller commuter airlines would take on routes that proved unprofitable for the larger airlines and paint their aircraft in the Allegheny Airlines livery, In turn Allegheny Airlines included the commuter airlines routes in their timetable and flight reservations systems as if they were mainline Allegheny flights, giving passengers the impression of completely integrated operations.

With this agreement Allegheny had a larger passenger base to fill there aircraft with while the feeder airlines saw huge growth in passenger numbers and revenue. Through the 1970's many other commuter airlines would join the Allegheny Commuter system providing feeder service from small communities for Allegheny Airlines. By the 1980s Allegheny Commuter was operating twelve French Nord 262 turboprops and three de Havilland Canada DHC-7 Dash 7 turboprops as well as a myriad of other aircraft. Allegheny Airlines changed its name to USAir in 1979 however the feeder network still carried the name of Allegheny Commuter until 1989 when it was changed to USAir Express.

After Allegheny Commuter became USAir Express, Crown Airways was taken over in a leveraged buyout in 1990 by two of its executives, Albert Beiga and Philip Burnaman. The carrier remained operating as USAir Express. Crown Airways ceased to exist in 1994 when it was purchased by Mesa Air Group.

Affiliate airlines 

Allegheny Commuter was operated by a myriad of smaller commuter airlines, these included:

 Aeromech Airlines
 Air Kentucky
 Air East
 Air North
 Britt Airways
 Crown Airways
 Chatauqua Airlines
 Fischer Brothers Aviation
 GCS Airlines
 Henson Airlines
 Pennsylvania Commuter Airlines
 Pocono Airlines
 Ransome Airlines
 Southern Jersey Airways
 Suburban Airlines
 The Hagerstown Commuter,
 Travel Air Aviation.

Fleet 

 Nord 262
 Mohawk 298
 de Havilland Canada DHC-7 Dash 7
 de Havilland Canada DHC-6 Twin Otter
 Short 330
 Short 360
 Fokker F27 Friendship
 Fairchild Metroliner III
 Riley Turbo Skyliner
 Beechcraft B99
 Beech 1900C
 Volpar Turboliner
 CASA C-212
 Embraer EMB 110P2 Bandeirante
 Saab 340

See also 
 List of defunct airlines of the United States

References

Defunct companies based in Pennsylvania
Defunct regional airline brands
Defunct regional airlines of the United States
Jefferson County, Pennsylvania
US Airways Group
Mesa Air Group
Defunct airlines of the United States
Airlines based in Pennsylvania